Mid Devon is a local government district in Devon, England.  Its council is based in Tiverton.

The district was formed under the Local Government Act 1972, on 1 April 1974 by the merger of the borough of Tiverton and Crediton urban district together with Tiverton Rural District, and Crediton Rural District.  It was originally called Tiverton District, but was renamed in 1978 by resolution of the district council.

Geography
Mid Devon shares borders with several other Devon districts as well as the county of Somerset. Neighbouring districts include Exeter, East Devon, North Devon, Teignbridge, West Devon and Torridge. The area of Mid Devon, according to the Office for National Statistics Census table KS101EW is 91293.48 hectares, or 912.9348 sq kilometers, or 352.5 square miles.

Rivers
The Exe, the Culm, the Yeo, the Dalch, the Little Dart, the Taw, the Dart, the Brockley, the Creedy and the Spratford Stream flow through the district.

Raddon Top
Raddon Top (772 ft.) is the highest point of the Raddon Hills. Excavations at the summit in 1994 uncovered traces of Early Iron Age settlement.

Politics

Elections to Mid Devon council are held every four years. There are 41 councillors representing 23 wards. After the 2019 election, the council was run by a Liberal Democrat-Independent-Green coalition. However, the Council Leader, 'Independent' Bob Deed, removed the three Lib Dem's from the Cabinet in 2020, replacing them with Tories and in March 2021 removed the only Green from the Cabinet, ensuring a Tory Majority in Cabinet, and effectively creating a Tory Minority Administration.

Tourism

Grand Western Canal
The Grand Western Canal stretches from Canal Hill in Tiverton to just before the county boundary, near to Greenham, Somerset. It no longer operates for trade purposes, but is a popular tourist location. Visitors are able to walk along its banks or take a trip down the canal in a horse drawn barge. A static barge at the Canal Hill end of the canal offers refreshments. The site is one of two tourism spots owned by Devon County Council.

Exmoor
Exmoor National Park is a national park situated in Mid Devon and Somerset in South West England. The park covers 267 square miles (692 km²) of hilly open moorland. Exmoor is one of the first British National Parks, designated in 1954, and is named after its main river, the River Exe. Several areas of the moor have been declared a  Site of Special Scientific Interest.

Devon Railway Centre
The Devon Railway Centre is located at Bickleigh in Mid Devon, in a restored Victorian railway station on the closed Great Western Railway branch from Exeter to Dulverton. The Centre operates a 2 ft (610mm) gauge passenger railway and has a large collection of narrow gauge rolling stock, a miniature railway and a collection of model railways.

Coldharbour Working Wool Museum
Coldharbour Mill is a Grade II* listed Georgian mill complex in Uffculme, close to junction 27 (Tiverton turnoff) of the M5. The mill has the largest working waterwheel in the south west, and steams up its stationary steam engines most Bank Holidays. It has a number of other collections, such as dolls' houses, a large tapestry showing five local parishes, and a wide range of worsted wool spinning and weaving machines.

Major settlements
The major town of the district is Tiverton; other towns include Cullompton and Crediton.

See also
 Grade I listed buildings in Mid Devon
 Grade II* listed buildings in Mid Devon

References

External links

 
Non-metropolitan districts of Devon